Brandos Costumes (1974) is a Portuguese film directed by Alberto Seixas Santos which was a part of the Novo Cinema movement – influenced by the cinematographic neo-realism and specially by the Nouvelle Vague. It was released in 1975, when the political regime portrayed in the film (the Estado Novo) had already been destroyed.

The film was released in Cinema Londres, in Lisbon, on September 18, 1975.

Overview 
 Script: Alberto Seixas Santos, Luísa Neto Jorge, Nuno Júdice
 Director: Alberto Seixas Santos
 Production: Centro Português de Cinema (CPC) and Tóbis Portuguesa
 Financed by: Calouste Gulbenkian Foundation
 Shooting dates: March 1972, October 1973, finished in 1974
 Archive footage: Cinemateca Nacional, Emissora Nacional
 Film extracts: A Revolução de Maio, Chaimite
 Format: 35mm
 Genre: fiction (social drama)
 Duration: 72’
 Length: 1978 meters
 Distributor: Marfilmes (currently), Filmes Castello Lopes (on release date)
 Release date: Cinema Londres, in Lisbon, on September 18, 1975
 International English Titles: Gentle Costume, Gentle Morals, Mild Manners

Synopsis 
A portrait of the everyday life of a typical middle-class family in parallel with the fall of the Estado Novo, the 48-year dictatorship led by Salazar. The daughters' conflicts and frustrations with their parents, their grandmother and their maid find an obvious echo in the country's collective events. The Carnation Revolution is about to explode.

Historical context 
As a rupturing film, Brandos Costumes is less identifiable by the presence of avant-garde aesthetics or an agile plot with a daring structure - not like Belarmino, by Fernando Lopes or O Cerco, by António da Cunha Telles - than by its ideological left-wing posture, taking a portrait of the social classes, and by its social and political sense of critic.

Some characteristics of the new generation films, revolted with the state of things and motivated to denounce the social injustices, are clearly present in Brandos Costumes. The theatrical tone of the representation of this work let it be integrated in the tradition that Manoel de Oliveira (O Passado e o Presente - 1971) explores.

Cast 
 Luís Santos (father)
 Dalila Rocha (mother)
 Isabel de Castro (older daughter)
 Sofia de Carvalho (younger daughter)
 Constança Navarro (grandmother)
 Cremilde Gil (servant-maid)

Crew 
 Director: Alberto Seixas Santos
 Producers: Henrique Espírito Santo e Jorge Silva Melo
 Cinematographer: Acácio de Almeida
 Image Operator: Francisco Silva
 Image Assistants: Pedro Efe e Octávio Espírito Santo
 Lighting: João de Almeida, Manuel Carlos e Joaquim Alves
 Editing: Solveig Nordlund
 Sound designer: João Diogo
 Music: Jorge Peixinho
 Image Laboratory: Tobis Portuguesa
 Sound Laboratory: Valentim de Carvalho

References

External links 
 

Portuguese drama films